The 1933 Rutgers Queensmen football team represented Rutgers University in the 1933 college football season. In their third season under head coach J. Wilder Tasker, the Queensmen compiled a 6–3–1 record, won the Middle Three Conference championship, and outscored their opponents 146 to 94.

Schedule

References

Rutgers
Rutgers Scarlet Knights football seasons
Rutgers Queensmen football